Bùi Thị Ngà (born August 15, 1994 in Ninh Bình) is a former member of the Vietnam women's national volleyball team. She was the captain of Bộ Tư lệnh Thông tin Women's Volleyball Club.

Biography & Career 
Ngà was born in 1994 in Khánh Cường, Yên Khánh, Ninh Bình.

Ngà played for the club Thông tin Liên Việt Post Bank.

In 2011, she played in the Vietnam's National Youth Team. After a year, she was given an official competitive spot by the team's coaches.

At ASIAD 2018, Ngà – along with Trần Thị Thanh Thúy – were the two athletes who scored the most points for the Vietnam's team after 6 matches.

Clubs 
  Thông tin Liên Việt Post Bank

Awards

Individual 
 2013 VTV Cup Championship "Best Blocker"
 2014 VTV Binh Dien International Cup "Best Blocker"
 2014 VTV Binh Dien International Cup "Best Spiker"
 2014 VTV Cup Championship "Best Blocker"
 2018 VTV Cup Championship "Best Middle Blocker"

Clubs
 2011 Vietnam League –  Runner-Up, with Thông tin Liên Việt Post Bank
 2012 Vietnam League –  Champion, with Thông tin Liên Việt Post Bank
 2013 Vietnam League –  Champion, with Thông tin Liên Việt Post Bank
 2014 Vietnam League –  Champion, with Thông tin Liên Việt Post Bank
 2015 Vietnam League –  Champion, with Thông tin Liên Việt Post Bank
 2016 Vietnam League –  Runner-Up, with Thông tin Liên Việt Post Bank
 2017 Vietnam League –  Runner-Up, with Thông tin Liên Việt Post Bank
 2018 Vietnam League –  Runner-Up, with Thông tin Liên Việt Post Bank
 2019 Vietnam League –  Champion, with Thông tin Liên Việt Post Bank
 2020 Vietnam League –  Champion, with Thông tin Liên Việt Post Bank
 2021 Vietnam League –  Champion, with Bộ Tư lệnh Thông tin – FLC

References

1994 births
Living people
Vietnamese women's volleyball players
People from Ninh Bình province
Vietnam women's international volleyball players
Southeast Asian Games silver medalists for Vietnam
Southeast Asian Games bronze medalists for Vietnam
Southeast Asian Games medalists in volleyball
Competitors at the 2017 Southeast Asian Games
Volleyball players at the 2018 Asian Games
Competitors at the 2019 Southeast Asian Games
Middle blockers
Asian Games competitors for Vietnam
21st-century Vietnamese women